Pinalia fitzalanii, commonly known as the common fuzz orchid, is a plant in the orchid family and is a clump-forming epiphyte or lithophyte. It has crowded pseudobulbs, each with three or four stiff, egg-shaped leaves sheathing the pseudobulb and up to thirty five creamy yellow flowers with soft hairs on the outside. It is found in moist habitats in New Guinea, the Solomon Islands and tropical North Queensland.

Description
The flowers have soft hairs on the outside, and open widely at first, before becoming cup-shaped. Flowering occurs between August and October.

Taxonomy and naming
The common fuzz orchid was first formally described in 1882 by Ferdinand von Mueller who gave it the name Eria fitzalanii and published the description in Southern Science Record. The type specimen was collected near the Mulgrave River by Eugene Fitzalan. In 1891, Otto Kuntze changed the name to Pinalia fitzalanii. The specific epithet (fitzalanii) honours the collector of the type specimen.

Distribution and habitat
Pinalia fitzalanii grows on rocks and on trees in humid places in forest and woodland. It is found in the Solomon Islands, in New Guinea and on the Cape York Peninsula in Queensland as far south as Townsville.

References

fitzalanii
Endemic orchids of Australia
Plants described in 1882
Orchids of Queensland